Artyom Shaloyan (born July 31, 1976) is an Armenian-born German weightlifter. He won a bronze medal for the 69 kg class at the 1995 European Weightlifting Championships in Warsaw, Poland. Shaloyan is currently a member of the weightlifting team for AV 03 Speyer, and is coached and trained by Frank Mantek.

Shaloyan represented his adopted nation Germany at the 2008 Summer Olympics in Beijing, where he competed for the men's lightweight category (69 kg). Shaloyan placed fourteenth in this event, as he successfully lifted 135 kg in the single-motion snatch, and hoisted 165 kg in the two-part, shoulder-to-overhead clean and jerk, for a total of 300 kg.

References

External links
NBC Olympics Profile

German male weightlifters
1976 births
Living people
Olympic weightlifters of Germany
Weightlifters at the 2008 Summer Olympics
Sportspeople from Gyumri
Armenian emigrants to Germany
German people of Armenian descent